Pelochyta albotestaceus is a moth of the family Erebidae first described by Walter Rothschild in 1909. It is found in Venezuela.

References

Moths described in 1909
Pelochyta